Felix Spencer Organ (born 2 June 1999) is an Australian-born English cricketer. He made his first-class debut for Hampshire in the 2017 County Championship on 13 September 2017. He made his List A debut for Hampshire in the 2017–18 Regional Super50 on 7 February 2018. He made his Twenty20 debut on 3 September 2020, for Hampshire in the 2020 t20 Blast.

References

External links
 

1999 births
Living people
English cricketers
Hampshire cricketers
Cricketers from Sydney
Dorset cricketers